The 2018 Thomas & Uber Cup (officially known as the  2018 BWF Thomas & Uber Cup) was the 30th edition of the Thomas Cup and the 27th edition of the Uber Cup, the biennial international badminton championship contested by the men and women's national teams of the member associations of Badminton World Federation (BWF). The tournament was hosted by Bangkok, Thailand 20–27 May 2018.

The matches were played at IMPACT Arena. It was the second time that Thailand hosted the Thomas Cup and the first time hosted the Uber Cup tournament and the first time this event was held in Southeast Asia since 2010 in Malaysia.

Denmark were the defending men's champions, and China were the defending women's champions.

Host selection
Bangkok and New Delhi submitted bids for this championships. Bangkok was named as the host in March 2017 during BWF Council meeting in Kuala Lumpur, Malaysia, where BWF also decided the host for 2018 BWF World Championships, 2019 Sudirman Cup and 2019 BWF World Championships.

Qualification

Thomas Cup 

Note

Uber Cup 

Note

Draw
The draw for the tournament was conducted on 22 March 2018, at 18:00 ICT, at Arnoma Grand Hotel in Bangkok. The 16 men and 16 women teams were drawn into four groups of four.

For the Thomas Cup draw, the teams were allocated to three pots based on the World Team Rankings of 22 February 2018. Pot 1 contained the top seed China (which were assigned to position A1), the second seed Denmark (which were assigned to position D1) and the next two best teams, Indonesia and Chinese Taipei. Pot 2 contained the next best four teams, and Pot 3 was for the ninth to sixteenth seeds.

A similar procedure was applied for Uber Cup draw, where top seed Japan (which were assigned to position A1), the second seed China (which were assigned to position D1), Korea and Thailand were in Pot 1.

Thomas Cup

Uber Cup

Squads

Tiebreakers
The rankings of teams in each group were determined as follows (regulations Chapter 5 Section 5.2.1. Article 12): 
Points
Results between tied teams
Match difference
Game difference
Point difference

Teams that won 3 match first win the tie: 1 point for the winner, 0 match points for the loser.

Thomas Cup

Group stage

Group A

Group B

Group C

Group D

Knockout stage

Bracket

Quarter-finals

Semi-finals

Final

Final ranking

Uber Cup

Group stage

Group A

Group B

Group C

Group D

Knockout stage

Bracket

Quarter-finals

Semi-finals

Final

Final ranking

International Broadcasters

See also
2017 Sudirman Cup
2018 BWF World Championships

References

External links
 Tournament Link
 Official website

 
World Championships, Team
Badminton, World Championships, Team
Badminton, World Championships, Team
Badminton, World Championships, Team
World Championships, Team
Badminton tournaments in Thailand
Thomas & Uber Cup
Badminton, World Championships, Team